Johanna Andreesen (also Johanna Andresen; 1886–?) was an Estonian politician. She was a member of II Riigikogu. She was a member of the Riigikogu since 17 May 1924. She replaced Eduard Parts. On 4 June 1924, she resigned his position and she was replaced by Aleksander Rimmel.

References

1886 births
Year of death missing
Workers' United Front politicians
Members of the Riigikogu, 1923–1926